Damian Arthur Christopher Alleyne (born March 31, 1983) is a Barbadian former swimmer who specialized in freestyle events. He is a two-time Olympian (2000 and 2004), a varsity swimmer for the Georgia Bulldogs, and a graduate of Bolles School and the University of Georgia, with a major in business administration.

Alleyne made his official debut, as a 17-year-old, at the 2000 Summer Olympics in Sydney. He failed to advance into the succeeding rounds in any of his individual events, finishing twenty-seventh in the 200 m freestyle (1:52.75), and twenty-sixth in the 400 m freestyle (3:58.12).

At the 2004 Summer Olympics in Athens, Alleyne maintained his program by qualifying for two swimming events. He cleared FINA B-standard entry times of 51.89 (100 m freestyle) and 1:53.19 (200 m freestyle) from the Pan American Games in Santo Domingo, Dominican Republic. In the 200 m freestyle, Alleyne challenged seven other swimmers on the third heat, including fellow two-time Olympians Joshua Ilika Brenner of Mexico and Giancarlo Zolezzi of Chile. He edged out Algeria's Mahrez Mebarek to take a third spot and thirty-fourth overall by 0.11 of a second in 1:52.89. In his second event, 100 m freestyle, Alleyne placed forty-eighth overall on the morning's preliminaries. Swimming in heat three, Alleyne matched his entry time of 51.89 to save a fifth spot over Zolezzi's compatriot Max Schnettler by 0.02 of a second.

References

External links
Player Bio – Georgia Bulldogs

1983 births
Living people
Commonwealth Games competitors for Barbados
Pan American Games competitors for Barbados
Olympic swimmers of Barbados
Swimmers at the 1998 Commonwealth Games
Swimmers at the 1999 Pan American Games
Swimmers at the 2000 Summer Olympics
Swimmers at the 2002 Commonwealth Games
Swimmers at the 2003 Pan American Games
Swimmers at the 2004 Summer Olympics
Barbadian male freestyle swimmers
Georgia Bulldogs men's swimmers
Sportspeople from Bridgetown